William or Bill Fawcett or variation, may refer to:

People
 William Fawcett (actor) (1894–1974), American actor who was awarded the Légion d'honneur
 William Fawcett (author) (1902–1941), English journalist and writer on horses, hunting, and racing
 William Fawcett (botanist) (1851–1926), British botanist and co-author of the Flora of Jamaica
 William Fawcett (British Army officer) (1727–1804), former Adjutant-General to the Forces 
 William Fawcett (engineer) (1763–1844), British engineer and manufacturer of guns and steam engines
 Bill Fawcett (footballer) (1890–1970), Australian rules footballer for Melbourne
 Bill Fawcett (writer) (born 1947), mystery and science-fiction author and editor who also publishes as Quinn Fawcett and William Fawcett
 Wilford Fawcett, aka "Captain Billy", "Billy Fawcett" (1885–1940), publisher and founder of Fawcett Publications

Other uses
 , two ships named after the engineer

See also 

 Fawcett (surname)
 William (disambiguation)
 Fawcett (disambiguation)
 Bill (disambiguation)